Jacobia is an unincorporated community of about 60 inhabitants in Hunt County, Texas between the cities of Greenville and Wolfe City.

References 

Unincorporated communities in Hunt County, Texas
Unincorporated communities in Texas